Veronica Maglia is a Swiss striker currently playing in Italy's Serie A for Torres CF, with whom she has also played the Champions League. She previously played for YB Frauen in the Swiss Nationalliga A.

References

1989 births
Living people
Swiss women's footballers
Expatriate women's footballers in Italy
Expatriate women's footballers in Spain
Swiss expatriate sportspeople in Spain
Swiss expatriate sportspeople in Italy
Zaragoza CFF players
Women's association football forwards
BSC YB Frauen players
Swiss Women's Super League players
Sportspeople from Thurgau
Swiss expatriate women's footballers